San Giuseppe is a hamlet in the province of Cuneo, Italy, 2.5 kilometers away from its municipal center, Sommariva Perno. San Giuseppe's population consists of 446 people:

 222 males
 242 females
 26 foreigners
 220 people aged 15 or above
 187 families

As of 2022, San Giuseppe has 172 buildings, although only 153 are used for residential purposes, 16 roads, a church, a holiday home, a bakery, a beekeeping center, and a restaurant.

References 

Frazioni of the Province of Cuneo